The Secretary of Dreams is a series of graphic short story collections authored by Stephen King and illustrated by Glenn Chadbourne.  Cemetery Dance Publications released the first volume in December 2006.

Volume 1

This volume includes six stories and was published in three editions:
"Slipcased Gift Edition" (Limited to 5,000 copies)
"Signed and traycased Limited Edition" (Limited to 750 copies)
"Deluxe signed Lettered Edition" (Limited to 52 copies with a deluxe traycase)

Heavily illustrated original texts
The following are the heavily illustrated versions of Stephen King's original texts that are included in Volume 1:
"Home Delivery"
"Jerusalem's Lot"
"The Reach"

Graphical adaptations
The following are the graphic format adaptations of Stephen King's short stories that are included in Volume 1:
"The Road Virus Heads North"
"Uncle Otto's Truck"
"Rainy Season"

Volume 2

Volume 2 of The Secretary of Dreams was released in October 2010; it also included six stories and was released in the same three limited editions as Volume 1.

Heavily illustrated original texts
The following are the heavily illustrated versions of Stephen King's original texts that are included in Volume 2:
"The Monkey"
"Strawberry Spring"
"In the Deathroom"

Graphical adaptations
The following are the graphical adaptations of Stephen King's short stories that are included in Volume 2:
"Gray Matter"
"One for the Road"
"Nona"

See also

List of comics based on fiction

References and links
 The Secretary of Dreams – Volume One at cemeterydance.com
 The Secretary of Dreams – Volume Two at cemeterydance.com
 The Secretary of Dreams – Volume One at stephenking.com
 The Secretary of Dreams – Volume Two at stephenking.com

2006 short story collections
American short story collections
Comics based on works by Stephen King
Short story collections by Stephen King
2010 short story collections
Cemetery Dance Publications books